Kimberly Campbell Buck is an American politician who served as a Democratic member of the Mississippi House of Representatives, representing the 72nd district from 2008 to 2016. Before serving in the legislature, Campbell Buck worked as a policy analyst for Jackson and clerked for the Mississippi Supreme Court. She resigned in May 2016 to serve as state director of AARP.

References

External links
 

Living people
Democratic Party members of the Mississippi House of Representatives
1972 births
Politicians from Jackson, Mississippi
Mississippi State University alumni
Auburn University alumni
University of Mississippi alumni
Lawyers from Jackson, Mississippi